Lakeshore Soccer Club is a Canadian semi-professional soccer club based in the Montreal suburb of Kirkland, Quebec. The club competes in the Ligue de Soccer Elite Quebec after playing in the Première Ligue de soccer du Québec from 2015-16.

History
The club was originally founded in 1966.

The club was originally set to join the Première Ligue de soccer du Québec for the 2012 season as one of the founding members, although that did not occur.

They eventually joined the PLSQ for the 2015 season. They had a successful inaugural season, finishing in second place in the league, one point behind champions CS Mont-Royal Outremont, while also winning the League Cup, defeating Mont-Royal 4-2 in extra time.

They did not return to the league for the 2017 season due to administrative constraints.

Seasons

Notable former players
The following players have either played at the professional or international level, either before or after playing for the PLSQ team:

Honours
Première Ligue de soccer du Québec
PLSQ League Cup (1): 2015

References

Association football clubs established in 1966
Lakeshore
Soccer clubs in Quebec